Los Mirlos (Spanish for "the Blackbirds") is a Peruvian cumbia band with origins in Moyobamba, Peru.

History
The band was originally formed when some of the band's founders moved from the town of Moyobamba in Peruvian Amazonia to Lima in 1972; they were signed by the record label Infopesa the next year and would go on to release nine albums and two compilation records with the label. Their music bears influence from psychedelic and surf rock as well as cumbia, with members of the band citing the music of groups such as Los Destellos and Los Chamas as important influences. The band often emphasised their connection with the Peruvian jungle.

The founding members of the group are:
 Jorge Rodríguez Grández (lead voice)
 Danny Fardy Johnston (guitar)
 Gilberto Reátegui (guitar)
 Wagner Grández (backing vocals, bongo)
 Carlos Vásquez (percussion)
 Hugo Jáuregui (timpani)
 Manuel Linares (bass)

Discography
 1973: El Sonido Selvático, Infopesa 8043
 1974: El Poder Verde, Infopesa 8061
 1975: Los Charapas de Oro, Infopesa 8069
 1975: El Milagro Verde, Infopesa 8088
 1976: Tirense con la escoba, Infopesa 8097
 1976: Cumbia De Los Pajaritos
 1977: Tu Ñaña, Infopesa 8108
 1978: Cumbia Amazónica (compilation)
 1978: Internacionalmente, Infopesa
 1980: Con sabor a selva, Infopesa
 1980: Lo Mejor de los Mirlos (Vol. 1), Infopesa
 1980: Cumbia Amazónica vol. 2 (compilation)
 1982: Lo nuevo de Los Mirlos, Pantel
 1982: Tiro al blanco, Infopesa
 1982: Lo Mejor de los Mirlos (Vol. 2), Infopesa
 1984: Cumbia Thriller, CBS
 1986: El encanto de Los Mirlos 1988: Los Reyes de la cumbia amazónica, Microfón
 1989: Con sabor a cumbia, Música & Marketing
 1990: La Ladrona, Música & Marketing
 1991: La Historia de Los Mirlos, Música & Marketing
 1992: Los Mirlos, with Raúl Pastor, Magenta
 1993: Pídeme la luna, Magenta
 1994: Minuto a minuto, Magenta
 1994: 15 Grandes Éxitos, Música & Marketing
 1995: Enamorado, Magenta
 1996: El amor hecho canción, Magenta
 1997: Como amiga, Magenta
 1998: La cumbia de los negros, Eccosound
 2000: Por siempre 2010: Calidad sin fronteras 2014: Cumbia Amazónica, 1972-1980 14 Éxitos, Infopesa
 2018: Corazón Amazónico''

References

External links

Peruvian musical groups
Cumbia musical groups
Musical groups established in 1972